Židovići is a small town in the municipality of Pljevlja, Montenegro.

Demographics
According to the 2003 census, the town had a population of 653 people.

According to the 2011 census, its population was 694.

References

Populated places in Pljevlja Municipality